Emma Lazarus (July 22, 1849 – November 19, 1887) was an American author of poetry, prose, and translations, as well as an activist for Jewish and Georgist causes. She is remembered for writing the sonnet "The New Colossus", which was inspired by the Statue of Liberty, in 1883. Its lines appear inscribed on a bronze plaque, installed in 1903, on the pedestal of the Statue of Liberty. The last lines of the sonnet were set to music by Irving Berlin as the song "Give Me Your Tired, Your Poor" for the 1949 musical Miss Liberty, which was based on the sculpting of the Statue of Liberty (Liberty Enlightening the World). The latter part of the sonnet was also set by Lee Hoiby in his song "The Lady of the Harbor" written in 1985 as part of his song cycle "Three Women".

Lazarus was also the author of Poems and Translations (New York, 1867); Admetus, and other Poems (1871); Alide: An Episode of Goethe's Life (Philadelphia, 1874); Poems and Ballads of Heine (New York, 1881); Poems, 2 Vols.; Narrative, Lyric and Dramatic; as well as Jewish Poems and Translations.

Early years and education
Emma Lazarus was born in New York City, July 22, 1849, into a large Sephardic Jewish family. She was the fourth of seven children of Moses Lazarus, a wealthy Jewish merchant and sugar refiner, and Esther Nathan. One of her great-grandfathers on the Lazarus side was from Germany; the rest of her Lazarus and Nathan ancestors were originally from Portugal and they were resident in New York long before the American Revolution, they were among the original twenty-three Portuguese Jews who arrived in New Amsterdam after they had fled from their settlement in Recife, Brazil in an attempt to flee from the Inquisition. Lazarus's great-great-grandmother on her mother's side, Grace Seixas Nathan (born in Stratford in 1752) was also a poet. Lazarus was related through her mother to Benjamin N. Cardozo, Associate Justice of the Supreme Court of the United States. Her siblings included sisters Josephine, Sarah, Mary, Agnes and Annie, and a brother, Frank.

Privately educated by tutors from an early age, she studied American and British literature as well as several languages, including German, French, and Italian. She was attracted in youth to poetry, writing her first lyrics when eleven years old.

Career

Writer

The first stimulus for Lazarus's writing was offered by the American Civil War. A collection of her Poems and Translations, verses written between the ages of fourteen and seventeen, appeared in 1867 (New York), and was commended by William Cullen Bryant. It included translations from Friedrich Schiller, Heinrich Heine, Alexandre Dumas, and Victor Hugo. Admetus and Other Poems followed in 1871. The title poem was dedicated "To my friend Ralph Waldo Emerson", whose works and personality were exercising an abiding influence upon the poet's intellectual growth. During the next decade, in which "Phantasies" and "Epochs" were written, her poems appeared chiefly in Lippincott's Monthly Magazine and Scribner's Monthly.

By this time, Lazarus's work had won recognition abroad. Her first prose production, Alide: An Episode of Goethe's Life, a romance treating of the Friederike Brion incident, was published in 1874 (Philadelphia), and was followed by The Spagnoletto (1876), a tragedy. Poems and Ballads of Heinrich Heine (New York, 1881) followed, and was prefixed by a biographical sketch of Heine; Lazarus's renderings of some of Heine's verse are considered among the best in English. In the same year, 1881, she became friends with Rose Hawthorne Lathrop. In April 1882, Lazarus published in The Century Magazine the article "Was the Earl of Beaconsfield a Representative Jew?" Her statement of the reasons for answering this question in the affirmative may be taken to close what may be termed the Hellenic and journeyman period of Lazarus's life, during which her subjects were drawn from classic and romantic sources.

Lazarus also wrote The Crowing of the Red Cock, and the sixteen-part cycle poem "Epochs". In addition to writing her own poems, Lazarus edited many adaptations of German poems, notably those of Johann Wolfgang von Goethe and Heinrich Heine. She also wrote a novel and two plays in five acts, The Spagnoletto, a tragic verse drama about the titular figure and The Dance to Death, a dramatization of a German short story about the burning of Jews in Nordhausen during the Black Death. During the time Lazarus became interested in her Jewish roots, she continued her purely literary and critical work in magazines with such articles as "Tommaso Salvini", "Salvini's 'King Lear, "Emerson's Personality", "Heine, the Poet", "A Day in Surrey with William Morris", and others.

Lines from her sonnet "The New Colossus" appear on a bronze plaque which was placed in the pedestal of the Statue of Liberty in 1903. The sonnet was written in 1883 and donated to an auction, conducted by the "Art Loan Fund Exhibition in Aid of the Bartholdi Pedestal Fund for the Statue of Liberty" in order to raise funds to build the pedestal. Lazarus's close friend Rose Hawthorne Lathrop was inspired by "The New Colossus" to found the Dominican Sisters of Hawthorne.

She traveled twice to Europe, first in 1883 and again from 1885 to 1887. On one of those trips, Georgiana Burne-Jones, the wife of the Pre-Raphaelite painter Edward Burne-Jones, introduced her to William Morris at her home. 
She also met with Henry James, Robert Browning and Thomas Huxley during her European travels. A collection of Poems in Prose (1887) was her last book. Her Complete Poems with a Memoir appeared in 1888, at Boston.

Activism
Lazarus was a friend and admirer of the American political economist Henry George. She believed deeply in Georgist economic reforms and became active in the "single tax" movement for land value tax. Lazarus published a poem in the New York Times named after George's book, Progress and Poverty.

Lazarus became more interested in her Jewish ancestry as she heard of the Russian pogroms that followed the assassination of Tsar Alexander II in 1881. As a result of this anti-Semitic violence, and the poor standard of living in Russia in general, thousands of destitute Ashkenazi Jews emigrated from the Russian Pale of Settlement to New York. Lazarus began to advocate on behalf of indigent Jewish immigrants. She helped establish the Hebrew Technical Institute in New York to provide vocational training to assist destitute Jewish immigrants to become self-supporting. Lazarus volunteered in the Hebrew Emigrant Aid Society employment bureau; she eventually became a strong critic of the organization. In 1883, she founded the Society for the Improvement and Colonization of East European Jews.

The literary fruits of identification with her religion were poems like "The Crowing of the Red Cock", "The Banner of the Jew", "The Choice", "The New Ezekiel", "The Dance to Death" (a strong, though unequally executed drama), and her last published work (March 1887), "By the Waters of Babylon: Little Poems in Prose", which constituted her strongest claim to a foremost rank in American literature. During the same period (1882–87), Lazarus translated the Hebrew poets of medieval Spain with the aid of the German versions of Michael Sachs and Abraham Geiger, and wrote articles, signed and unsigned, upon Jewish subjects for the Jewish press, besides essays on "Bar Kochba", "Henry Wadsworth Longfellow", "M. Renan and the Jews", and others for Jewish literary associations. Several of her translations from medieval Hebrew writers found a place in the ritual of American synagogues. Lazarus's most notable series of articles was that titled "An Epistle to the Hebrews" (The American Hebrew, November 10, 1882 – February 24, 1883), in which she discussed the Jewish problems of the day, urged a technical and a Jewish education for Jews, and ranged herself among the advocates of an independent Jewish nationality and of Jewish repatriation in Palestine. The only collection of poems issued during this period was Songs of a Semite: The Dance to Death and Other Poems (New York, 1882), dedicated to the memory of George Eliot.

Death and legacy

Lazarus returned to New York City seriously ill after she completed her second trip to Europe, and she died two months later, on November 19, 1887, most likely from Hodgkin's lymphoma. She never married. Lazarus was buried in Beth Olam Cemetery in Cypress Hills, Brooklyn. The Poems of Emma Lazarus (2 vols., Boston and New York, 1889) was published after her death, comprising most of her poetic work from previous collections, periodical publications, and some of the literary heritage which her executors deemed appropriate to preserve for posterity. Her papers are kept by the American Jewish Historical Society, Center for Jewish History, and her letters are collected at Columbia University.

A stamp featuring the Statue of Liberty and Lazarus's poem, "The New Colossus", was issued by Antigua and Barbuda in 1985. In 1992, she was named as a Women's History Month Honoree by the National Women's History Project. Lazarus was honored by the Office of the Manhattan Borough President in March 2008, and her home on West 10th Street was included on a map of Women's Rights Historic Sites. In 2009, she was inducted into the National Women's Hall of Fame. The Museum of Jewish Heritage featured an exhibition about Lazarus in 2012.

Biographer Esther Schor praised Lazarus' lasting contribution:
The irony is that the statue goes on speaking, even when the tide turns against immigration — even against immigrants themselves, as they adjust to their American lives. You can’t think of the statue without hearing the words Emma Lazarus gave her.

Style and themes

Lazarus contributed toward shaping the self-image of the United States as well as how the country understands the needs of those who emigrate to the United States. Her themes produced sensitivity and enduring lessons regarding immigrants and their need for dignity. What was needed to make her a poet of the people as well as one of literary merit was a great theme, the establishment of instant communication between some stirring reality and her still-hidden and irresolute subjectivity. Such a theme was provided by the immigration of Russian Jews to America, consequent upon the proscriptive May Laws of 1882. She rose to the defense of her ethnic compatriots in powerful articles, as contributions to The Century (May 1882 and February 1883). Hitherto, her life had held no Jewish inspiration. Though of Sephardic ancestry, and ostensibly Orthodox in belief, her family had till then not participated in the activities of the synagogue or of the Jewish community. Contact with the unfortunates from Russia led her to study the Torah, the Hebrew language, Judaism, and Jewish history. While her early poetry demonstrated no Jewish themes, her Songs of a Semite (1882) is considered to be the earliest volume of Jewish American poetry.

A review of Alide by Lippincott's Monthly Magazine was critical of Lazarus's style and elements of technique.

Selected works

"In the Jewish Synagogue at Newport"
"In Exile"
"Progress and Poverty"
"The New Colossus"
"By the Waters of Babylon"
"1492"
"The New Year"
"The South"
"Venus of the Louvre"

Notes

References

Citations

Attribution

Bibliography
 Beilin, Israel Ber. Dos lebn fun Ema Lazarus a biografye. 1946. Nyu-Yorḳ : Yidishn fraṭernaln folḳs-ordn
 Cavitch, Max. (2008). "Emma Lazarus and the Golem of Liberty." The Traffic in Poems: Nineteenth-Century Poetry and Transatlantic Exchange. Ed. Meredith McGill. Rutgers University Press. 97–122. .

External links
 
 
 
 Jewish Virtual Library: Emma Lazarus
 Jewish Women's Archive: HISTORY MAKERS: Emma Lazarus, 1849–1887
 Finding aid to Emma Lazarus, 1868–1929, at Columbia University. Rare Book & Manuscript Library.
 National Public Radio: "Emma Lazarus, Poet of the Huddled Masses"
 Jewish-American Hall of Fame: Virtual Tour: Emma Lazarus (1849–1887)
 
 "Who Was Emma Lazarus?" by Dr. Henry Henry Abramson
 

1849 births
1887 deaths
19th-century American poets
19th-century American women writers
Activists from New York City
American feminist writers
American people of German-Jewish descent
American people of Portuguese-Jewish descent
American Sephardic Jews
American women poets
Burials at Beth Olom Cemetery
Georgists
Jewish American activists
Jewish American poets
Jewish feminists
Jewish women writers
Statue of Liberty
Writers from New York City
19th-century Sephardi Jews
Deaths from cancer in New York (state)
Deaths from Hodgkin lymphoma